Stratton is a village, ward and former civil parish about 22 miles from Gloucester, now in the parish of Cirencester, in the Cotswold district, in the county of Gloucestershire, England. In 2018 the built up area and ward had an estimated population of 2584. In 1931 the parish had a population of 963. Stratton was on the A417, construction of the Cirencester and Stratton bypass was due to be started in 1994 and was complete in December 1997.

Amenities 
Stratton has a church called St Peter's on Daglingworth Road; a pub called The Plough Inn on Gloucester Road; a primary school on Thessaly Road a village hall on Thessaly Road; and a post office at 17-19 Cheltenham Road.

History 
The name "Stratton" means 'Roman road farm/settlement'. Stratton is on the line of Ermine Street Roman road. Stratton was recorded in the Domesday Book as Stratune. On 1 April 1935 the parish was abolished and merged with Cirencester, Baunton and Daglingworth.

References 

Villages in Gloucestershire
Former civil parishes in Gloucestershire
Cirencester